William Morse may refer to:
 William Morse (Medal of Honor), United States Navy sailor and Medal of Honor recipient
 William Morse (British politician), member of parliament for Bridgwater
 William M. Morse, American surveyor and politician in Wisconsin
 William P. Morse, United States Army officer
 William Reginald Morse, Canadian author, medical doctor, and medical missionary